The garnet robin (Eugerygone rubra) is a species of bird in the family Petroicidae. It is monotypic within the genus Eugerygone. It is found in New Guinea, where its natural habitat is subtropical or tropical moist montane forests.

Taxonomy
The garnet robin was described by the English ornithologist, Richard Bowdler Sharpe, in 1879, from a specimen collected in the Arfak Mountains on the island of New Guinea. He coined the binomial name Pseudogerygone rubra. It was moved to the genus Eugerygone by the German naturalist, Otto Finsch, in 1901.

References

garnet robin
Birds of New Guinea
garnet robin
Taxonomy articles created by Polbot